Mikel Iturria Segurola (born 16 March 1992 in Urnieta) is a Spanish cyclist, who currently rides for UCI ProTeam . In August 2018, he was named in the startlist for the Vuelta a España.

Major results
2013
 7th Overall Ronde de l'Isard
 8th Overall Vuelta a la Comunidad de Madrid U23
2019
 1st Stage 11 Vuelta a España
 7th Klasika Primavera
2021
 3rd Trofeo Andratx – Mirador d’Es Colomer
 5th Prueba Villafranca - Ordiziako Klasika

Grand Tour general classification results timeline

References

External links

1992 births
Living people
Spanish male cyclists
Cyclists from the Basque Country (autonomous community)
People from Donostialdea
Sportspeople from Gipuzkoa
Spanish Vuelta a España stage winners
20th-century Spanish people
21st-century Spanish people